Jay Ifeanyi-Junior Tyron Enem (born 11 March 2003) is a Dutch professional footballer who plays as a forward for Italian  club Vis Pesaro, on loan from Venezia.

Club career
Enem has spent his formation years at AFC, AZ Alkmaar and Ajax.

After coming through the youth ranks at the latter club, he made his debut for Jong Ajax on 11 March 2022, coming on as a substitute in a 3-3 Eerste Divisie draw against FC Dordrecht. During the 2021-22 season, he also became the top scorer for Ajax's under-18 team. In the summer of 2022, the striker featured for Ajax's senior team in pre-season friendly matches, scoring against NK Lokomotiva Zagreb.

On 18 August 2022, Enem joined Serie B club Venezia on a permanent deal, signing a two-year contract, with an option for another season, and being initially registered for the under-19 team. He then made his first-team debut on 21 January 2023, coming on as a substitute in the final minutes of a 1-0 Serie B win against Südtirol.

On 31 January of the same year, Enem joined Serie C side Vis Pesaro on loan until the end of the season.

Personal life 
Enem is of Nigerian descent.

References

External links
 
 

2003 births
Living people
Dutch footballers
Association football forwards
Amsterdamsche FC players
AZ Alkmaar players
AFC Ajax players
Jong Ajax players
Venezia F.C. players
Vis Pesaro dal 1898 players
Eerste Divisie players
Serie B players
Serie C players
Dutch expatriate footballers
Expatriate footballers in Italy
Dutch expatriate sportspeople in Italy